Qarah Tappeh (also Romanized as Qareh Tappeh; also known as Karatepeh, Qarā Tappeh, and Qara Tepe) is a village in Barvanan-e Sharqi Rural District, Torkamanchay District, Meyaneh County, East Azerbaijan Province, Iran. At the 2006 census, its population was 122, in 35 families.

References 

Populated places in Meyaneh County